Socheon-myeon (Hangeul: 소천면, Hanja: 小川面) is a myeon or a township in Bonghwa county of North Gyeongsang province in South Korea. The total area of Socheon-myeon is 264.17 square kilometers, and, as of 2006, the population was 2,519 people. Socheon-myeon is further divided into seven "ri", or small villages.

Socheon-myeon is famous for the production of Chinese dates, daechu, and for the Hongje Temple.

Administrative divisions
Hyeondong-ri (현동리)
Goseon-ri (고선리)
Imgi-ri (임기리)
Dueum-ri (두음리)
Seocheon-ri (서천리)
Namhoeryong-ri (남회룡리)
Buncheon-ri (분천리)

Schools
Socheon Elementary School(소천초등학교) in Hyeondong-ri with branch facilities in Buncheon-ri, Imgi-ri, Dueum-ri, and Namhoeryong-ri.
Socheon Middle School (소천중학교) in Hyeondong-ri.
Socheon High School (소천고등학교) in Hyeondong-ri.

References

Sources 
 Socheon-myeon Office Homepage
 Tourist Map of Bonghwa county including Socheon-myeon

Bonghwa County
Towns and townships in North Gyeongsang Province